Dale or dales may refer to:

Locations
 Dale (landform), an open valley
 Dale (place name element)

Geography
Australia
The Dales (Christmas Island), in the Indian Ocean

Canada
Dale, Ontario

Ethiopia
Dale (woreda), district

Norway
Dale, Fjaler, the administrative centre of Fjaler municipality, Vestland county
Dale, Sel, a village in Sel municipality in Innlandet county
Dale, Vaksdal, the administrative centre of Vaksdal municipality, Vestland county
Dale Church (Fjaler), a church in Fjaler municipality, Vestland county
Dale Church (Luster), a church in Luster municipality, Vestland county
Dale Church (Vaksdal), a church in Vaksdal municipality, Vestland county
Dale Church (also known as Norddal Church), a church in Fjord municipality, Møre og Romsdal county

Poland
Dale, Lesser Poland Voivodeship (south Poland)

Sweden
The Dales, English exonym for Dalarna province

United Kingdom
Dale, Cumbria, a hamlet in England
Dale, Derbyshire, England
Dale, Pembrokeshire, Wales
Derbyshire Dales, England
Yorkshire Dales, England

United States
Dale, Illinois
Dale, Indiana
Dale, Boone County, Indiana
Dale, Iowa
Dale, Kentucky, a defunct community since annexed to Fort Thomas
Dale, Michigan, in Tobacco Township
Dale, Minnesota
Dale, Nebraska
Dale, New York
Dale, Oklahoma
Dale, Oregon
Dale, Pennsylvania
Dale, Berks County, Pennsylvania, an unincorporated community
Dale, South Carolina, an unincorporated community
Dale, Texas, an unincorporated community
Dale, West Virginia
Dale, Wisconsin
Dale (CDP), Wisconsin
Dale City, Virginia
Dale County, Alabama
Dale County School District in Alabama
Dales, California

People
Dale (given name)
Dale (surname)

Entertainment and Fiction
Dale Gribble, a character on the animated series King of the Hill
Dale Cooper, a character on the TV series Twin Peaks
Dale Horvath, a character in the comic and TV series The Walking Dead
Dale (film), a film about the life of Dale Earnhardt
Dale (Middle-earth), a city in J. R. R. Tolkien's fictional universe of Middle-earth
The Dales, a BBC radio soap opera originally called Mrs Dale's Diary
Dale (album), album by American rapper Pitbull released in 2015
The Dalelands, a geographical area in the fictional world of the Forgotten Realms
Dale Bishop, the local sheriff of Bristol Cove, Washington, and recurring character of Freeform's 2018 television showSiren.
Dale, one of the Chip 'n' Dale animated chipmunks created by the Walt Disney Company

Other
Dale (automobile)
Dale (crater) on the Moon
Dale of Norway, a textile company based in Dale, Vaksdal municipality, Norway
The Dale, nickname for Rochdale A.F.C.
Boy Scouts of America v. Dale, a First Amendment opinion from the US Supreme Court
USS Dale, various ships
Dale Electronics, Inc., of Columbus, Nebraska, USA, an electronic components manufacturer, acquired by Vishay Intertechnology in 1985

See also
Dell (landform), a small wooded valley
Dell (disambiguation)
Vale (disambiguation), a wide river valley
Dales pony
The Dales (disambiguation)
Dalles (disambiguation)